
Gmina Komorniki is a rural gmina (administrative district) in Poznań County, Greater Poland Voivodeship, in west-central Poland.

The largest village is Komorniki, with 3,500 inhabitants.

Neighbouring gminas
Gmina Komorniki is bordered by the towns of Luboń, Poznań and Puszczykowo, and by the gminas of Dopiewo, Mosina and Stęszew.

Villages 
The gmina contains the following villages: Chomęcice, Głuchowo, Jarosławiec, Komorniki, Łęczyca, Rosnówko, Rosnowo, Szreniawa, Walerianowo, Wiry, Wypalanki and Plewiska.

Culture
 Komorniki Festival of Organ and Chamber Music
 Polish Baroque Orchestra

External links
 Official Website of Gmina Komorniki
 Komorniki Festival of Organ and Chamber Music

References
Polish official population figures 2006

Komorniki
Poznań County